WWW is the World Wide Web, a system of interlinked hypertext documents accessed via the Internet.

WWW may also refer to:

Music
WWW  (Jaejoong album) (2013)
"WWW", a 2002 song by Leningrad from Piraty XXI veka
Woman Worldwide (Justice remix album) (2018)

Media
 WWW (film), a 2021 Indian computer screen thriller film
WWW (TV series), an Austrian children's series
WWW, the production code for the 1974 Doctor Who serial Invasion of the Dinosaurs
Search: WWW, a South Korean television series
Willi wills wissen, a German children's series

Other uses
WWW Trilogy, a trilogy of books
Waterproof wristlet watch, a British military specification for a wristwatch
World Three or WWW, an antagonistic group of characters in Mega Man Battle Network
World Women's Wrestling
Wawa language's ISO 639-3 code
Wolverine World Wide's NYSE ticker symbol
Wootton Wawen railway station's station code
WWW, a signature acronym associated with the Order of the Arrow

See also

Pronunciation of "www", an initialism for World Wide Web
Rod Serling's Triple W: Witches, Warlocks and Werewolves
3W (disambiguation)
W3 (disambiguation)
Web (disambiguation)
Wild Wild West (disambiguation)
World Wide Web Conference, a yearly international academic conference on the topic of the future direction of the World Wide Web